Inquisitor isabella is a species of sea snail, a marine gastropod mollusk in the family Pseudomelatomidae, the turrids and allies.

Description
The length of the shell attains 21,0 mm, its diameter 6,5 mm

Distribution
This marine species occurs off Mozambique.

References

 Kilburn, R.N., 1988. Turridae (Mollusca: Gastropoda) of southern Africa and Mozambique. Part 4. Subfamilies Drilliinae, Crassispirinae and Strictispirinae. Annals of the Natal Museum 29(1): 167-320

External links
 
 

isabella
Gastropods described in 1988